Waria is a locality in Durgapur, in the district of Paschim Bardhaman of West Bengal, India. It is located between the neighbourhoods of Mayabazar and Andal. The river Damodar flows to its south. The Durgapur Steel Plant and the Durgapur Thermal Power Station of the Damodar Valley Corporation are close to the Waria railway station.

References 

Durgapur, West Bengal
Villages in Paschim Bardhaman district